1982 ballet premieres, List of
Lists of ballet premieres by year
Lists of 1980s ballet premieres
Ballet